North Somerset Community Hospital is a health facility in Old Street, Clevedon, North Somerset, England. Since April 2020, it is managed by Sirona Care & Health.

History
The facility was financed and opened by Sir Arthur Hallam Elton, a local member of parliament, as the Clevedon Cottage Hospital in 1875. It joined the National Health Service in 1948 and the inpatient unit was extensively refurbished and modernised between 2016 and 2017.

References

Hospital buildings completed in 1875
Hospitals established in 1875
Hospitals in Somerset
NHS hospitals in England
1875 establishments in England